NLGJA: The Association of LGBTQ+ Journalists,  is an American professional association dedicated to unbiased coverage of LGBTQ issues in the media.  It is based in Washington, D.C., and the membership consists primarily of journalists, students, educators, and communications professionals. The organization was previously known as the National Lesbian and Gay Journalists Association (NLGJA), but changed its name in 2013 to "NLGJA: The Association of LGBT Journalists" to reflect the diversity of the communities it represents.  In 2016, it added a "Q", updating its name to "NLGJA: The Association of LGBTQ Journalists". In 2023, it added a "+", updating its name to "NLGJA: The Association of LGBTQ+ Journalists".

According to the NLGJA website, "NLGJA: The Association of LGBTQ+ Journalists, is an organization of journalists, media professionals, educators and students working from within the news industry to foster fair and accurate coverage of LGBTQ issues. NLGJA opposes all forms of workplace bias and provides professional development to its members." The association offers professional development opportunities for its members, in addition to resources newsrooms including a Rapid Response Task Force, Stylebook Supplement on LGBTQ Terminology, and informational tip-sheets.

History
The association was founded by Roy Aarons in 1990, along with other journalists, Elaine Herscher, Shannon Hickey, David Tuller, Victor Zonana, and Kathleen Buckley, who made up its first board.

Jen Christensen took over as NLGJA national president following the death of Michael Triplett, who died January 18, 2013, less than six month after his election.

Past national Presidents of NLGJA include Roy Aarons, Karen-Louise Boothe, Robert Dodge, Steven Petrow, Eric Hegedus, David Steinberg and Michael Triplett.

NLGJA hosts three annual benefit events to support its programs throughout the year: the Headlines & Headliners Benefit in New York City, Dateline:DC in Washington, DC, and L.A. Exclusive in Los Angeles.  The events have drawn guests including Don Lemon, Hoda Kotb, Meredith Vieira, Rue McClanahan, and Barry Manilow.

The association has inspired the founding of the French association of LGBTQ journalists in 2013.

NLGJA works with the Centers for Disease Control as part of the Partnering and Communicating Together to Act Against AIDS (PACT) program. As part of the partnership, NLGJA offers workshops and resources to educate journalists about the HIV & AIDS epidemic.

Conventions
From its inception in 1990, NLJGA hosts an annual convention inviting their members to participate in top-level training sessions, thought-provoking discussions, and social & professional networking events. From 2003 to 2016, a one-day LGBT Media Summit was added to the event to educate and network journalists working within LGBT media.

The 2012 convention was the first time NLGJA participated in the joint UNITY Journalists convention, held in Las Vegas with the Asian American Journalists Association, the National Association of Hispanic Journalists and the Native American Journalists Association.

2010 marked the 20th anniversary for NLGJA. It hosted its annual convention in San Francisco. In 2009 , NLGJA held its first international convention in Montreal, Quebec, Canada.

Previous conventions have been held in Atlanta, Chicago, Dallas, Los Angeles, New York City, Philadelphia, Las Vegas and San Francisco, among other cities.

Newsletter
The group published a quarterly newsmagazine called Outlook until the mid-2000s.  The magazine focused on LGBTQ stories in the workplace and workplace issues such as domestic partner benefits, and updates readers on NLGJA's activities at the local and national levels. The magazine had a circulation of over 3,500.  As it was written by news professionals, it had a high level of professional writing and was recognized as a source for commentary on LGBTQ workplace issues.

LGBTQ Journalist Hall of Fame
Starting in 2005, the NLGJA has inducted noteworthy LGBTQ journalists into a Hall of Fame so that their legacy may be remembered for generations to come.  Inductions occur during the NLGJA National Convention each year along with the annual Excellence in Journalism awards.

Inductees by year:

2017
 Jinx Beers: Founding publisher and first managing editor of America's longest running lesbian newspaper, The Lesbian News, launched in 1975. She is a pioneering journalist as well as a lifelong feminist and advocate for human rights.
 Dan Savage: Award-winning journalist and author, TV personality, and activist best known for his political and social commentary, as well as his honest approach to sex, love and relationships. His sex advice column, “Savage Love,” introduced over 25 years ago, is now syndicated throughout the U.S., Canada, Europe and Asia.

2016
 Ina Fried: American journalist for Recode. Prior to that, she was senior editor for All Things Digital and a senior staff writer for CNET Network's News.com. She is a frequent commenter on technology news on National Public Radio, local television news and for other print and broadcast outlets.
 LZ Granderson: American journalist, a contributor at ABC News and a columnist for ESPN. A senior writer and columnist for ESPN The Magazine and ESPN.com's Page 2, he has contributed to the channel's SportsCenter, Outside the Lines, Around the Horn, SportsNation, and First Take and commentates for ESPN's coverage of the U.S. Open tennis tournament.

2015
 Armistead Maupin: Treasured author of nine best-selling novels, including six Tales of the City which were originally collected from the daily serials he wrote in the San Francisco Chronicle beginning in 1976.
 Charles Kaiser: Began writing for The New York Times while still an undergraduate at Columbia University. After eight years at the Times, he also wrote for Newsweek, The Wall Street Journal, Vanity Fair, The Washington Post, and The Los Angeles Times, as well as publishing three books, including the Lambda Literary Award-winning The Gay Metropolis.
 Lou Chibbaro Jr.: A prize-winning reporter for the nation's oldest LGBT news publication, The Washington Blade, Chibbaro first took up his pen in 1976 under the pseudonym Lou Romano
 Alan Bell: Beginning in 1977 when he founded Gaysweek, New York City's first mainstream lesbian and gay newspaper, and continuing with BLK and Blackfire, Bell has been a pioneer of LGBT journalism and activism, particularly on issues surrounding HIV/AIDS.
 Alison Bechdel: Creator of the Bechdel Test for gender bias in works of fiction, has been writing for and about the LGBT community since 1983 when she began producing and self-syndicating Dykes to Watch Out For, a comic chronicling the lives, romances, and political involvement of a group of lesbians in the United States.
 Randy Alfred:  Co-founder of the San Francisco Bay Times, Alfred produced and hosted The Gay Life on KSAN-FM –the first regularly scheduled LGBT-oriented program on commercial radio.

2014
 Donna Cartwright: Believed to be the first Times staffer to publicly disclose her status as a transgender person when interviewed in 1998 by Barbara Walters on ABC Television to discuss her decision to resolve her gender conflict and to transition as a woman.
 Lisa Keen: Served as the top editor of one of the nation's most respected gay publications, The Washington Blade, for 18 years. She was one of the first two reporters for a gay newspaper to be credentialed to cover the White House and Congress, she has covered U.S. Supreme Court cases since 1985 and she is one of the only reporters to carefully analyze gay voting trends in presidential elections.
 Tracy Baim: Publisher and co-founder of the Windy City Times, Baim began her career at Gay Life newspaper in 1984, a month after graduating from Drake University.

2013
 Mark Segal: Publisher of the Philadelphia Gay News and gay activist.
 Bob Ross: Founder of the Bay Area Reporter.

2012
 Jill Johnston: writer for the Village Voice and New York Times Book Review. She is best known for her book Lesbian Nation: The Feminist Solution.
 Randy Wicker: the first openly gay person on East Coast television, and considered the first out PR professional.

2011
 W. Dorr Legg: pioneering gay activist and co-founder of ground-breaking gay publication, ONE, Inc.
 Don Michaels: reporter in the 1970s for highly respected Washington Blade, and later its publisher.
 Michelangelo Signorile: author; Sirius XM radio host; co-founding editor of influential OutWeek magazine.

2010
 Lisa Ben, pseudonym for the editor of the first lesbian publication, Vice Versa
 Hank Plante: Emmy- and Peabody-winning television anchor and reporter.
 Richard Rouilard: Early NLGJA member and editor-at-large for The Advocate magazine.

2009
 Garrett Glaser: the first television journalist to come out of the closet to the radio and television news industry
 Ronald Gold: A sharp writer with an uncompromising style, Gold built a career writing for a number of publications, including Variety
 Deb Price: Began her column for The Detroit News inviting readers to help her come up with a less awkward way of introducing her boss to her partner

2008
 Richard Goldstein: Founder of the Village Voices annual Queer issue and author of several novels and essays on issues within the gay rights movement
 Gail Shister: First mainstream reporter to be vocally "out" and an active member of the NLGJA

2007
 Jim Kepner: Writer for publications like ONE magazine and the PRIDE newsletter, which then became the Los Angeles Advocate
 Jack Nichols: Founding editor of GAY newspaper and one-time editor of Sexology and GayToday.com
 Barbara Gittings and Kay Tobin Lahusen: Known for their work with The Ladder, the Daughters of Bilitis publication; also participated in early gay rights demonstrations during the 1960s

2006
 Marlon Riggs: Writer and director of documentary films about the gay rights movement and race relations

2005
 Leroy F. Aarons: Founder of the NLGJA who was an author, playwright, and journalist
 Phyllis Lyon & Del Martin: Founders of lesbian publication The Ladder and the first same-sex couple to be married in San Francisco
 Thomas Morgan III: New York Times reporter and editor who, as president of the National Association of Black Journalists, opened doors for fellow gay and lesbian journalists
 Sarah Pettit: Co-creator of Out magazine and one-time Arts editor for Newsweek and OutWeek
 Randy Shilts: Reporter for The Advocate and the San Francisco Chronicle and author of several books focused on the AIDS epidemic
 Don Slater: Founded ONE magazine and fought for freedom of distribution of gay and lesbian publications

Excellence in Journalism Awards
Continuing a tradition started in 1993, the NLGJA Excellence in Journalism Awards are given each year to recognize journalists who have made a difference in their field.  Each year the organization chooses recipients for awards in over 30 categories spanning fields including local television, radio, HIV/AIDS coverage, photojournalism, and feature writing.  The awards are given out at the NLGJA National Convention each year.

2018 NLGJA Excellence in Journalism Award recipients

The 2018 Excellence in Journalism Awards were announced on July 3, 2018, with awards presentations scheduled for September 8–10, 2018, in Palm Springs, California, during the organization's three-day annual convention.
 NLGJA Journalist of the Year Award: Ronan Farrow
 Sarah Pettit Memorial Award for the LGBTQ Journalist of the Year: Diane Anderson-Minshall
 The Al Neuharth Award for Innovation in Investigative Journalism: Ken Schwencke for “Documenting Hate”, ProPublica and the Documenting Hate Coalition
 Excellence in Book Writing Award: Judy Wieder for “Random Events Tend To Cluster”, Lisa Hagan Books
 Excellence in Feature Writing Award: Alex Mohajer for "A Tale of Two Marches," Huffington Post
 Excellence in Feature Writing Award (Daily): Kathryn Joyce for “She Was an Ultraconservative Texas Christian. Then Kai Was Born and Everything Changed”, Splinter
 Excellence in Longform Journalism Award: Laura Rena Murray for “Trans, Teen and Homeless: On the Streets of New York With America’s Most Vulnerable Population”, Rolling Stone
 Excellence in News Writing Award: Jen Colletta for “Lesbian Couple Turned Away From PA Bridal Shop”, Philadelphia Gay News
 Excellence in News Writing Award (Non-daily): David Artavia for “Sordid Lives Actor Alleges Mogul Benny Medina Tried to Rape Him”, The Advocate
 Excellence in Photojournalism Award: Carolyn Van Houten for “Life in Transition”, San Antonio Express-News
 Excellence in Profile Writing Award: Danika Worthington for “Portraits of Pride: An Exploration of the LGBTQ Community Ahead of PrideFest”, Denver Post
 Excellence in Sports Writing Award: Tim Teeman for “When Floyd Mayweather Shouts ‘Faggot’, This Is What LGBT People Hear”, The Daily Beast
 Excellence in Student Journalism Award: Leah Juliett for “Youth and LGBTQ Communities Disproportionately Victimized by Revenge Porn and Cyber Crimes”, GLAAD
 Excellence in Travel Writing Award: Christopher Muther for “For Real: Salt Lake City is America’s Super Gay, Super Cool Hipster Haven”, The Boston Globe
 Excellence in Blogging Award: Josh Robbins for “Fauci: From a Practical Standpoint the Risk is Zero”, ImStillJosh.com
 Excellence in Digital Video Award: Roman Feeser, Alex Romano, Angelica Fusco, Nia Stevens and Luisa Garcia for “Uncharted: State of Mind”, CBS News
 Excellence in Multimedia Award: Bill Daley for “Belmont Rocks: New Project Remembers Popular LGBTQ Gathering Spot”, The Chicago Tribune
 Excellence in Online Journalism Award: Jessica Mason Pieklo for “Cakes for the Klan? Conservatives Craft a Trojan Horse in Supreme Court’s LGBTQ Discrimination Case”, Rewire.News
 Excellence in Column Writing Award: Lucas Grindley for “LGBTs to America: ‘We Told You So‘”, The Advocate
 Excellence in Opinion/Editorial Writing Award: Chase Strangio for “How Transgender People Have Survived (and Thrived) Under a Year of Donald Trump”, INTO
 Excellence in Documentary Award
Nick Broomfield and Marc Hoeferlin for “Whitney: Can I Be Me”, Showtime and BBC
 Excellence in Local Television Award
Peggy Kusinski, Katy Smyser, Lisa Capitanini, Richard Moy, Julio Martinez and Nathan Halder for “Some Local Rules Keep Transgender Athletes From Competing In High Schools”, NBC5 Chicago
 Excellence in Network Television Award
Todd Cross and Gabe Gutierrez for “One Year After Pulse Nightclub Shooting, 4 People Reflect on How Their Lives Changed”, Sunday TODAY with Willie Geist/NBC
 Excellence in Podcast Award: Jacob Brogan and Benjamin Frisch for “Working”, Slate
 Excellence in Radio Award
Natalie Winston, Gabriela Saldivia and David Greene for “‘They Told Me I Wasn’t A Human Being’: Gay Men Speak Of Brutal Treatment In Chechnya”, National Public Radio
 Excellence in Bisexual Coverage Award
Kate Sloan and Indiana Joel for “What It’s Like to Talk to Your Doctor About Sexual Health When You’re Bisexual”, Xtra
 Excellence in HIV/AIDS Coverage Award
Linda Villarosa for “America’s Hidden HIV Epidemic”, The New York Times Magazine
 Excellence in Queer People of Color (QPOC) Coverage Award
Margie Fishman for “A Child’s Journey to ‘Truegender’”, The News Journal/USA Today
 Excellence in Religion Coverage Award
Phoebe Wang for “God + The Gays”, The Heart (Radiotopia)'

NLGJA Journalist of the Year Award recipients
 2017: Katie Barnes, ESPN
 2016: Dominic Holden, BuzzFeed News
 2015: J. Lester Feder, BuzzFeed
 2014: Chris Geidner, BuzzFeed
 2013: Michael Luongo, Freelance
 2012: Steven W. Thrasher, Village Voice
 2011: LZ Granderson, ESPN Magazine
 2010: Randy Gener, American Theatre
 2008: Martha Irvine, Associated Press
 2007: James Kirchick
 2006: Jason Bellini, CBS News on Logo
 2005: Meredith May, San Francisco Chronicle

Sarah Pettit Memorial Award for LGBTQ Journalist of the Year recipients
 2017: Erik Hall, OutSports
 2016: Lucas Grindley, The Advocate
 2015: Trish Bendix, AfterEllen
 2014: Lila Shapiro, The Huffington Post
 2013: Lila Shapiro, The Huffington Post
 2012: Chris Geidner, Metro Weekly and BuzzFeed
 2011: Michael Luongo, Freelance writer
 2010: Kerry Eleveld, The Advocate
 2008: First Place: Laura Douglas-Brown, Southern Voice
 Second Place: Lou Chibbaro Jr., Washington Blade
 Third Place: Kynn Bartlett, Colorez!
 2007: Ryan Lee, Southern Voice
 2006: Malinda Lo, AfterEllen.com
 2005: John Caldwell, The Advocate

Contributions to journalism

NLGJA Stylebook Supplement on LGBTQ Terminology
The NLGJA's most noteworthy tangible contribution to the journalism industry is the NLGJA Stylebook Supplement on LGBTQ Terminology, which fellow journalists can use for reference when writing about topics relating to the LGBTQ community.  According to the organization's website it is part of the NLGJA's push to encourage "the association's mission of inclusive coverage of LGBTQ people".

The Stylebook Supplement can be found on the NLGJA website in both English and Spanish.

Press service
In connection with Witeck-Combs Communications, the NLGJA launched OutNewsWire in 2008 to simplify the distribution of news articles relating to the LGBTQ community.  The wire has more than 400 journalists receiving updates currently, which are available online.  The service comes at a discounted price to "nonprofits hoping to use the service to reach the LGBTQ media".

Newsroom Outreach Project
As early as 1996, the NLGJA, along with Hollywood Supports, developed “sexual orientation in the workplace” seminars that were conducted in Knight Ridder newspapers across on the nation.  The seminars were designed to place emphasis on acceptance in the workplace, through discussions of stereotypes and business and legal issues involved with the LGBTQ community.  The stated goal of these seminars was to provide an LGBTQ-friendly office environment for LGBTQ journalists, but the discussions also pushed for domestic partnership benefits at newspapers across the nation, one of the main focuses of the LGBTQ rights movement nationwide. The seminars are offered free of charge to news organizations.

During the seminars, facilitators introduce employees to the “model of parity” NLGJA developed in order to encourage equality and inclusiveness within the workplace.  There are fourteen steps in this model, highlighting both workplace climate and fair compensation.  Included in these steps are things like avoiding double standards, promoting balanced coverage, providing the same insurance coverage for all employees, and offering family and medical leave.

Rapid Response Task Force
In order to more directly combat biased journalism, the NLGJA formed the Rapid Response Task Force.  This team of journalists addresses any news piece that readers report as being offensive or inaccurate and informs writers and readers of the correct terminology, which furthers their mission of equality and helps to “spread awareness about issues facing the LGBTQ community”. In order to report a biased or offensive story, readers simply email the link or a description of the article to the NLGJA and the problem is evaluated.

Student outreach
In an attempt at connecting with and encouraging future LGBTQ journalists, the NLGJA created the CONNECT: Student Journalism Project.  The program brings 12 young journalists to NLGJA's National Convention each year to form a newsroom and cover the local community and convention events. Since its inception, over 200 students have participated in the CONNECT program.

The NLGJA offers several scholarships each year to students "committed to NLGJA's mission of fair and accurate coverage of the LGBTQ community."  These scholarships include the Leroy F. Aarons scholarship and the Kay Longcope Scholarship scholarship, each of which provides tuition money to one LGBTQ student a year.

Membership

Between 2008 and 2009, the organization lost members due to the number of people laid off in the media industry that year. Since then, membership has steadily grown to include over 750 members.

See also 
 National Gay Newspaper Guild

References

External links
 NLGJA Homepage
 Re:Act to your news blog - the official blog of NLGJA
 NLGJA Student Central

American journalism organizations
Journalism-related professional associations
 
LGBT organizations in the United States
LGBT professional associations
1990 establishments in the United States